The 2022–23 season is the 56th in the history of Sivasspor and their sixth consecutive season in the top flight. The club are participating in the Süper Lig, the Turkish Cup, Turkish Super Cup, the UEFA Europa League, and the UEFA Europa Conference League.

Players

Squad

Out of squad

Out on loan

Pre-season and friendlies

Competitions

Overall record

Süper Lig

League table

Results summary

Results by round

Matches 
The league schedule was released on 4 July.

Turkish Cup

Turkish Super Cup

UEFA Europa League

Play-off round 
The draw for the play-off round was held on 2 August 2022.

UEFA Europa Conference League

Group stage 

The draw for the group stage was held on 26 August 2022.

Knockout phase

Round of 16 
The draw for the round of 16 was held on 24 February 2023.

References 

Sivasspor seasons
Sivasspor